Salvador Franch (born 18 April 1949) is a Spanish water polo player. He competed at the 1972 Summer Olympics and the 1980 Summer Olympics.

See also
 Spain men's Olympic water polo team records and statistics
 List of men's Olympic water polo tournament goalkeepers

References

External links
 

1949 births
Living people
Water polo players from Barcelona
Spanish male water polo players
Water polo goalkeepers
Olympic water polo players of Spain
Water polo players at the 1972 Summer Olympics
Water polo players at the 1980 Summer Olympics
20th-century Spanish people